Gumiel may refer to any of the following four municipalities located in the province of Burgos, Castile and León, Spain:

Gumiel de Izán
Gumiel de Mercado
Villalbilla de Gumiel
Villanueva de Gumiel